
Gmina Czerniewice is a rural gmina (administrative district) in Tomaszów Mazowiecki County, Łódź Voivodeship, in central Poland.

The gmina contains part of the protected area called Spała Landscape Park.

Villages
Gmina Czerniewice contains the villages and settlements of Annopol Duży, Annopol Mały, Annów, Chociw, Chociwek, Czerniewice, Dąbrówka, Dzielnica, Gaj, Helenów, Józefów, Krzemienica, Lechów, Lipie, Mała Wola, Nowa Strzemeszna, Nowe Studzianki, Paulinów, Podkonice Duże, Podkonice Małe, Podkonice Miejskie, Podkońska Wola, Stanisławów Lipski, Stanisławów Studziński, Strzemeszna, Strzemeszna Pierwsza, Studzianki, Teodozjów, Turobów, Wale, Wielka Wola, Wólka Jagielczyńska, Zagóry, Zubki Duże and Zubki Małe.

Neighbouring gminas
Gmina Czerniewice is bordered by the gminas of Cielądz, Inowłódz, Lubochnia, Rawa Mazowiecka, Rzeczyca and Żelechlinek.

References
Polish official population figures 2006

Czerniewice
Tomaszów Mazowiecki County